Nacionalinė Futbolo Akademija (National Football Academy), commonly referred to as NFA, is the national association football centre  of Lithuania; only the best players from the country train there. Established in Kaunas in 2006 with help of UEFA, it has already produced some high class players. Scouts from clubs like Arsenal, Liverpool, Milan and Lazio are constantly watching academy's players. The main point of this centre is to produce players for national team, Lithuania'a U-19 team is formed mainly from members of the academy, it has 15 players playing abroad.

See also

Lithuania national football team
Lithuania national under-21 football team
Lithuania national under-19 football team

References

External links
Lithuanian Football Federation website
Article about the academy on UEFA.com 

Lith
Football venues in Lithuania
Buildings and structures in Kaunas
Sport in Kaunas
National football academies